The 2022 Women's Asia-Oceania Floorball Cup was a continental floorball tournament held in Singapore from 23 to 28 May 2022. Matches was held at the OCBC Arena.

Preliminary round

Final round

Fifth place playoff

Bronze medal match

Final

Final standing
The official IFF final ranking of the tournament:

External links

References

Floorball Asia-Oceania Cup
Asia-Oceania Floorball Cup
Asia-Oceania Floorball Cup